The early Canadian banking system (British North America and New France until 1763; then renamed Upper and Lower Canada) was regulated entirely by the colonial government. Primitive forms of banking emerged early in the colonial period to solve the drain of wealth caused by the application of mercantilist theory. The drain of wealth translated into a complete lack of gold or silver bullion in the colonies, and thus, a complete lack of forms of economic exchange and payment.



History
In New France, playing cards were issued as a method of payment in the 1680s by the Intendant of New France, in addition to the coins introduced in the 1660s. However, the massive drain of wealth from New France to Europe resulting from mercantilist trade policies made it impossible to back card money with gold bullion. Card money was thus essentially worthless. The card system collapsed in the 1690s, causing long-term suspicion of paper money on the part of the French settlers.

Card money was replaced in the 18th century by a type of promissory note called bons, derived from the French phrase, bon pour, meaning good for the indicated amount. These were issued to a limited extent by French merchants, who, lacking in any other form of currency, were forced to create their own, and who consequently became the first Canadian bankers. The issue of bons spread rapidly into British North America after 1763, when New France became a British possession.

Bons persisted as the most common type of currency until 1812, along with the English pound, American and Spanish coinage, and the Halifax standard.

The British administration under Isaac Brock introduced what became known as army bills in 1812, in order to finance the War of 1812. The total value of these bills was 250,000 pounds. These were promissory notes issued directly by the government. They came into wide usage during the war (1812–1815) to make up for the lack of bullion in Upper and Lower Canada. Unlike the card money used in the late 17th century, army bills could be and were in fact exchanged for gold coin once the war had ended. The army bills had thus proven themselves reliable, eradicating any real stigma against paper currency.

In 1817, Montreal bankers were granted a charter by the British government to open the first formal bank in Canada. This was the Bank of Montreal. Under its charter, the Bank of Montreal was given a monopoly on the right to issue promissory notes on the model of the army bills. Because of its monopoly rights, the Bank of Montreal essentially acted as a central bank for both Upper and Lower Canada.

In the years after 1817, Britain granted several new bank charters, including a charter to the now-defunct Bank of Kingston, which was to act as a competitor to the Bank of Montreal in Upper Canada. The new chartered banks were required under the terms of their charters to recognise one another's currency, a practice that allowed for the development of long-distance trade within British North America. However, banking remained in private hands, which meant that the issue of currency was at the discretion of private bankers. This frequently led to high inflation when the infant Canadian economy was in recession(source?).

The Provincial Note Act was passed in 1866 to link note issue to the needs of the British administration. This marked the beginning of an enduring policy of government intervention in the Canadian economy. The British North America Act of 1867 formally codified this policy, allowing for government control over coinage, currency, bills of exchange, promissory notes, banking, and incorporation of banks. This in turn allowed for the creation of a uniform currency across Canada. Official Canadian currency took the form of the Canadian dollar in 1871, overriding the currency of individual banks.

After Confederation, Canada developed a banking system very different from that of the United States. Whereas the United States was served a large number of small banks serving just one town or, at most state, Canada's banking sector came to be dominated by a few banks with transcontinental branch networks. The Canadian system promoted stability and produced far fewer bank failures than either the contemporary United States or Australian banking systems. The downside of the Canadian banking system was that it was much less competitive that the United States and Australian systems, which meant that consumers paid more for banking services.  The legal foundation of the Canadian banking system consisted of a series of laws passed in 1870 and 1871. 

Banking remained relatively decentralized until 1935, when the Bank of Canada was founded in response to the economic instability experienced during the Great Depression in Canada. First opened on December 5, 1980, Canada's Currency Museum is located on the ground floor of the Bank of Canada in Ottawa, Ontario.

References

 Breckenridge, Roeliff Morton. The History of Banking in Canada. Washington: Government Printing Office, 1910.
 Easterbrook, W. T. and Hugh G. J. Aitken. Money and Banking in Canadian Development. In Canadian Economic History, pp. 445-475. Toronto: University of Toronto Press, 2002.
 Hammond, Bray. Banking in Canada before Confederation, 1792-1867. In W. T. Easterbrook and M. H. Watkins (Eds.), Approaches to Canadian Economic History. Montreal: McGill-Queen's University Press, 2003.
 McIvor, R. Craig. Canadian Monetary, Banking and Fiscal Development. Toronto: Macmillan Company of Canada Limited, 1958.
 Adam Shortt (1898) The early history of Canadian banking : Canadian currency and exchange under French rule, Journal of the Canadian Bankers' Association via Internet Archive

See also

 Canadian dollar
 Bank of Canada
 History of banking

 

Financial history of Canada
Banking in Canada